Isamoltane (CGP-361A) is a drug used in scientific research. It acts as an antagonist at the β-adrenergic, 5-HT1A, and 5-HT1B receptors. It has about five times the potency for the 5-HT1B receptor (21 nmol/L) over the 5-HT1A receptor (112 nmol/L). It has anxiolytic effects in rodents.

References

5-HT1A antagonists
5-HT1B antagonists
Secondary alcohols
Beta blockers
Phenol ethers
Pyrroles
Isopropylamino compounds
Secondary amines